Karl Anders Kraft (born 18 October 1968 in Askim, Gothenburg) is a Swedish journalist and news anchor working for TV4.

See also
Mass media in Sweden

References

Swedish journalists
1968 births
Living people
People from Gothenburg
Swedish television journalists